The Chaillu Mountains are a mountain range straddling southern Gabon and the Republic of Congo which is named after the French explorer Paul Du Chaillu, who explored and documented this region in the 19th century.  

The highest peaks are Mont Iboundji (980m), and Mt Mimongo (1020 m). The rocks of the range are sedimentary in origin. 

The range is home to the rises of several rivers including the Louesse, Ogoulou, Ikoy, Lolo, Lekoko, Lebombi, and Offoue.

References
 Gardinier David. 1994. Historical Dictionary of Gabon 2nd Edition. USA: The Scarercrow Press, Inc

Mountain ranges of Gabon
Tourist attractions in Gabon
Mountain ranges of the Republic of the Congo